Nonell is a surname. Notable people with the surname include:

Carmen Nonell (born 1920), Spanish novelist
Isidre Nonell (1872–1911), Spanish painter
Lluís Nonell (1926–1982), Spanish actor

See also
Norell

 Surnames of Spanish origin
Catalan-language surnames